La Palma is a municipality and town in the Pinar del Río Province of Cuba. It is located in the northern part of the province, on the coast of the Straits of Florida, north of Consolación del Sur and north-east of Viñales.

Overview
The Viñales Valley World Heritage Site is located east of La Palma, while the Sierra del Rosario Biosphere Reserve extends to the east.

La Palma Municipal Museum is located in the Martí street.

Demographics
In 2004, the municipality of La Palma had a population of 35,426.

See also
Municipalities of Cuba
List of cities in Cuba

References

External links

Populated places in Pinar del Río Province